JoAnn Alfano is an American television producer.

Career
Alfano replaced Suzanne Daniels as Executive Vice President Entertainment at Lifetime Networks in late 2008.

Prior to starting TV Tray Entertainment in June 2007, Alfano was President of Broadway Video Television, where she developed and executive produced NBC's 30 Rock and the ABC series Sons and Daughters.

Alfano rose through the ranks at NBC, from New York-based publicist to become Senior Vice President of Drama Development, and then Senior Vice President of Comedy Development. She was also Vice President of Prime Time Series for NBC Studios. Before that, Alfano was Director of Current Comedy for NBC Entertainment. She had previously been Director, NBC Media Relations and Primetime Series.

Before joining Lifetime, Alfano was president of her production company, TV Tray Entertainment, which had a first look deal at NBC Universal Media Studios.

Positions held
30 Rock (executive producer)
The Gleib Show
To Love and Die (executive producer)
Sons & Daughters
Thick and Thin
The Weekend
Untitled Oakley & Weinstein Project
The Tracy Morgan Show

Awards and nominations
Alfano was among those who shared the Emmy Award for Outstanding Comedy Series in 2007, and she was among those nominated for the Emmy Award for Outstanding Reality Competition Program in 2011.

References

External links

American television producers
American women television producers
Living people
Year of birth missing (living people)
Place of birth missing (living people)
Emmy Award winners
LGBT television producers
21st-century American women